Mi Media Naranja ("My Better Half" in Spanish) is the fourth studio album by American post-rock band Labradford. It was released on October 13, 1997 by Blast First and on November 19, 1997 by Kranky.

In 2016, Fact placed Mi Media Naranja at number eight on its list of the best post-rock albums of all time.

Track listing

Personnel
Adapted from the Mi Media Naranja liner notes.

Labradford
 Carter Brown – keyboards
 Robert Donne – bass guitar
 Mark Nelson – vocals, guitar

Additional musicians
 Chris Johnston – violin
 Ulysses Kirksey – violin

Production and design
 Labradford – recording, mixing
 Claire Lewis – production
 John Morand – recording, mixing
 N. Terry – cover art

Release history

References

External links
 

1997 albums
Labradford albums
Blast First albums
Kranky albums